The Alliance for the Albanians (ASH; , AA) is a centre-right political party founded in 2015 in North Macedonia by Ziadin Sela.

The party has as its main goal the achievement of the full national equality between Albanians and Macedonians in all fields, from investments, to institutional representation, fair access to state institutions, employment, infrastructure and increase of the level of national awareness.

Well aware of the many challenges faced by North Macedonia society in a prolonged socio- economic transition, the Alliance for the Albanians strives for and believes in a multi-ethnic, European, democratic and social governance model that can and should guarantee a better life for all citizens, as a precondition for sustainable economic development and political stability.

The fundamental principles of its political platform are the full equality between communities, the rule of law, a social welfare state, merit based and transparent recruitment in the state administration and the prevention of the emigration of educated young professionals and the Albanians in general from the country.

History 

Following disagreement with the leadership of the Albanian Democratic Party on the reform needs within the party, Ziadin Sela with a broad basis of support within the party, initiated from his hometown of Struga the Movement for Reforms in the Albanian Democratic Party in March 2015.

Foundation and ideology 
Later in 2015 the Movement for Reforms in the Albanian Democratic Party was registered as a political party with the same name, led by Ziadin Sela.

The newly established Movement for Reforms in the Albanian Democratic Party had as its main goal the achievement of the full national equality between Albanians and Macedonians in all fields, from investments, to institutional representation, fair access to state institutions, employment, infrastructure and increase of the level of national awareness.

In the course of 2016, the Movement for Reforms in the Albanian Democratic Party adopted the Alliance for the Albanians as its official name.

This change would be confirmed in March 2018, when the Alliance for the Albanians held its inaugural congress, Ziadin Sela was elected as President of the party.

The Alliance for the Albanians also adopted its updated Statute and the Political Platform of the Alliance for the Albanians 2018–2022 at its first congress.

Electoral results

2016 parliamentary election 
In the run up to the early parliamentary elections of 11 December 2016, the Movement for Reforms in the Albanian Democratic Party joined forces with two smaller parties, Unity and the Democratic National Renaissance, under a pre-electoral coalition named the Alliance for the Albanians. The Alliance for the Albanians emerged as the third largest force among Albanian political parties with 16.6% of the Albanian vote and three MPs in the Assembly of the Republic of North Macedonia.

2017 local election 
The Alliance for the Albanians ran for the first time at the municipal level in Macedonia at the November 2017 local election. The campaign was marked by significant tensions with government partners, SDSM and DUI which had entered into coalitions against the Alliance for the Albanians in all municipalities inhabited by Albanians.

Despite an extremely aggressive campaign from SDSM and DUI and an election marked by irregularities, the Alliance for the Albanians won the race for Mayors of Gostivar, Bogovinje and Vrapciste, while also winning 64 municipal councillor seats across the country.

2019 presidential election 
The Alliance for the Albanians, together with the Movement Besa, supported the candidacy of Blerim Reka, an independent Albanian candidate. Three candidates were on the ballot in the first round: Stevo Pendarovski of the ruling Social Democratic Union of Macedonia, Gordana Siljanovska- Davkova of the opposition VMRO-DPMNE party.

Blerim Reka came out third in the first round, with 79,888 votes, or 11.08% of overall votes.

In the second round, won by Stevo Pendarovksi, the Alliance for the Albanians didn't officially support any candidate.

2020 parliamentary election 
The Alliance for the Albanians ran for the 15 July 2020, early parliamentary election in a pre- electoral coalition with the Alternative under the moto "Time is Now!" and a joint programme "A State for All". Despite large-scale electoral fraud from the ruling parties, the coalition won 12 seats, out of which 8 went to the Alliance for the Albanians and 4 to the Alternative. In the current legislature, the Alliance for the Albanians and the Alternative are operating as a single parliamentary group representing Albanian opposition.

Governance

Central government 
Following the 11 December 2016, general election, the Alliance for the Albanians, in close coordination with international actors in Macedonia, played a major role in reaching the 61 MPs needed to form a new majority and end the two-year long political crisis that followed the wiretapping scandal involving key figures of the decade long VMRO-DPMNE – Democratic Union for Integration regime.

The Alliance for the Albanians participated in the new government with the Ministry of Health as well as Deputy Ministers for Foreign Affairs, Transport and Communications, and Labour and Social Policy. In the first few months of the new government, the Alliance for the Albanians led by example in implementing a solid reform strategy, putting accountability, transparency and inclusiveness at the centre of government action.

Arben Taravari, Minister of Health for the Alliance for the Albanians, was confirmed by a September 2017 poll of the International Republican Institute as the cabinet minister enjoying the biggest political support with 25%, even ahead of the Prime Minister.

However, the Alliance for the Albanians left the government less than six months after its establishment, as it was becoming clear that the SDSM and DUI were installing a new form of state capture, including the rehabilitation of corrupt politicians involved in the 2015 wiretapping scandal and daily corruption scandals.

Local government 
The Alliance for the Albanians have been governing the municipalities of Gostivar, Bogovinje and Vrapciste since October 2017, in a transparent and accountable way.

The municipality of Gostivar, led by Arben Taravari, has been leading among majority Albanian municipalities in various transparency indexes released by NGOs and international development agencies.

References

2015 establishments in the Republic of Macedonia
Albanian political parties in North Macedonia
Conservative parties in North Macedonia
Political parties established in 2015
Pro-European political parties in North Macedonia